The Frank R. Bowerman Landfill is a landfill in the western Santa Ana Mountains, in Orange County, California. It opened in 1990. The landfill is located between Limestone Canyon Regional Park and State Route 241.

It is one of the largest landfills in California and the ninth largest in the United States. It contains an estimated 31 million tons of waste.

History
It was named after Professor Frank R. Bowerman, former director of environmental engineering programs, at the University of Southern California, and former president of the American Academy of Environmental Engineers and the American Academy for Environmental Protection. Bowerman was also a technical consultant to the environmentally themed science fiction film Soylent Green.

Landfill gas utilization
It is the site for the world's first commercial landfill gas to liquid natural gas project, the Bowerman Landfill Project, constructed by Prometheus Energy, an LNG fuel company based in Redmond, Washington, and Montauk Energy, a capital investment firm.

References

External links
 "Resource recovery: An idea whose time has come", Frank Bowerman, in Water, Air, & Soil Pollution Vol. 4, No. 2, 147–153, 1975
Frank Bowerman at IMDB (consultant on the film "Soylent Green'')

Landfills in California
Liquefied natural gas
Geography of Orange County, California
Santa Ana Mountains
1990 establishments in California